Daniel Thomas Tehan (born 27 January 1968) is an Australian politician who was the Minister for Trade, Tourism and Investment in the Morrison Government from 2020 to 2022. He is a member of the Liberal Party and previously served as Minister for Defence Materiel (2016), Defence Personnel (2016–2017), Veterans' Affairs (2016–2017), Social Services (2017–2018), and Education (2018–2020). He has been a member of the House of Representatives since the 2010 election, representing the Victorian seat of Wannon.

Childhood and education
Tehan was born on 27 January 1968 in Melbourne, the third of six children born to Jim and Marie Tehan. His mother was elected to the Parliament of Victoria in 1987 and served as a state government minister, while his father was a country vice-president of the Liberal Party of Australia (Victorian Division). Tehan grew up on the family's farming property near Mansfield, Victoria. His paternal grandfather Jim Tehan helped establish the National Farmers' Federation. His mother and aunt both died of Creutzfeldt–Jakob disease.

Tehan attended a Catholic primary school and a public high school in country Victoria before completing his secondary education as a boarder at Xavier College, Melbourne. He holds the degrees of Bachelor of Arts (Hons.) from the University of Melbourne, Master of Foreign Affairs and Trade from Monash University, and Master of International Relations from the University of Kent in England.

Early career
Tehan worked with the Department of Foreign Affairs and Trade from 1995 to 1998 and then was a member of the diplomatic service from 1999 to 2001. He was posted to Mexico City and was also involved with Central America and Cuba. In 2002 he was seconded to the office of Trade Minister Mark Vaile. When Vaile became deputy prime minister in 2005 Tehan remained with him as a senior adviser. He later served as chief of staff to Fran Bailey, the Minister for Small Business and Tourism. After the defeat of the Howard Government, he served as director of trade policy and international affairs with the Australian Chamber of Commerce and Industry (2007–2008) and deputy state director of the Liberal Party in Victoria (2008–2009).

Politics
Tehan was elected to the House of Representatives at the 2010 federal election, succeeding David Hawker in the Division of Wannon. He was encouraged to run for Liberal preselection by Denis Napthine, a family friend, and beat nine other candidates in the ballot despite his lack of prior connections with the area. He and his family moved to Hamilton in order to live in the electorate.

In February 2015, Tehan publicly supported Prime Minister Tony Abbott in the lead-up to a motion to spill the leadership of the Liberal Party. He reportedly also supported Abbott in the September 2015 leadership spill which saw him replaced by Malcolm Turnbull.

Turnbull Government
On 13 February 2016 it was announced that Tehan would be appointed the Minister for Veterans' Affairs, the Minister for Defence Materiel, and the Minister Assisting the Prime Minister for the Centenary of ANZAC following a rearrangement in the First Turnbull Ministry.

With the reelection of the Turnbull Government after the 2016 election, Tehan kept his Veterans' Affairs and Centenary of ANZAC portfolios and moved from Defence Materiel to Defence Personnel in the Second Turnbull Ministry. Despite his earlier support of Tony Abbott, in June 2017 he publicly criticised him for his perceived lack of support for the Turnbull Government. In the fourth rearrangement of the same Turnbull ministry, on 20 December 2017 Tehan was promoted to the Minister for Social Services and served as a member of the Cabinet.

Morrison Government
During the August 2018 Liberal leadership spills, Tehan announced that he would not vote to depose a sitting prime minister. When Turnbull withdrew from the second vote, he supported Scott Morrison. Tehan was subsequently appointed Minister for Education in the first Morrison Ministry.

Tehan commissioned two reviews into academic freedom following a series of controversies. The first, led by Robert French, recommended the adoption of a freedom-of-speech code, with universities agreeing to implement this by the end of 2020. The second, led by Sally Walker, examined university responses to the French code.

In 2020, Tehan announced a policy whereby university course fees would be altered to encourage "job-ready graduates", with fees to be increased for arts, commerce and law but reduced for STEM subjects. He later proposed that students failing more than half of their courses be denied access to government loans.

Tehan was moved to the trade portfolio in a December 2020 cabinet reshuffle, prompted by the retirement of Mathias Cormann. He took over negotiations for the proposed Australia–UK free trade agreement from his predecessor Simon Birmingham.

Political positions
Tehan is a member of the centre-right faction of the Liberal Party.

Tehan opposes same-sex marriage, but in June 2016 announced he would vote in parliament in accordance with the results of a nationwide plebiscite. In 2018 he delivered the St Thomas More Lecture in Canberra and spoke of a "creeping encroachment from the state on religious belief", suggesting the introduction of a national religious discrimination act.

Personal life
Tehan has five children with his wife Sarah and as of 2016 lived on a small farm near Hamilton, Victoria.

References

External links
 
 

|-

|-

|-

|-

|-

|-

|-

1968 births
Alumni of the University of Kent
Government ministers of Australia
Liberal Party of Australia members of the Parliament of Australia
Members of the Australian House of Representatives
Members of the Australian House of Representatives for Wannon
Living people
University of Melbourne alumni
Turnbull Government
21st-century Australian politicians
Members of the Cabinet of Australia
Morrison Government
Monash University alumni
People educated at Xavier College
Politicians from Melbourne